Saudi Arabia participated in the 2014 Asian Games in Incheon, South Korea from 19 September to 4 October 2014.

Medal summary

Medalists

Basketball

Group B

|}

Football

Men
Preliminary

Group A

Handball

Men

Group A

Rugby Sevens

Men
Repechage

Volleyball

Preliminary round

Pool B

|}

|}

References

Nations at the 2014 Asian Games
2014
Asian Games